The winners of the 12th Vancouver Film Critics Circle Awards, honoring the best in filmmaking in 2011, were announced on January 10, 2012.

Winners and nominees

International

Canadian

References

2011
2011 film awards
Van
2011 in British Columbia